General Sir Alexander Ernest Wardrop  (15 September 1872 – 22 June 1961) was a British Army General who rose to high rank in the 1930s.

Education
Wardrop was the only son of Maj.-Gen. Alexander Wardrop. He was educated at Haileybury and the Royal Military Academy, Woolwich.

Military career
Wardrop was commissioned into the Royal Artillery in 1892. He served in the Great War, initially as a Brigadier in the Guards Division which formed part of the British Expeditionary Force. He served in France and took part in the Battle of Vittorio Veneto in Italy in 1918.

After the War he was Commander Royal Artillery for the 3rd Army from 1918 and then Commander of British Troops in Palestine from  1921. He became Quartermaster-General for India in 1930 and General Officer Commanding-in-Chief for Northern Command in 1933; he retired in 1937. He lived at Upham in Hampshire.

References

 

1872 births
1961 deaths
People educated at Haileybury and Imperial Service College
Graduates of the Royal Military Academy, Woolwich
Knights Grand Cross of the Order of the Bath
Companions of the Order of St Michael and St George
Royal Artillery officers
British Army generals of World War I
Military personnel of British India